Stéphane Sednaoui is a French director, photographer, film producer and actor.

Over the years, Sednaoui has redefined his artistic approach to focus on his fine-art and cinematographic projects. New and existing work have been exhibited recently at the MoMA, New York (2015)– the National September 11 Memorial & Museum (2013–2015), New York – the Brooklyn Museum, New York (2013 – the (Barbican Center, London (2014) – Le Grand Palais, Paris (2015)– the National Gallery of Victoria, Melbourne (2014) and in a solo exhibition at the Sam Art Projects Foundation, Paris (2013).

Stéphane Sednaoui's career started 30 years ago exploring various film and photographic territories. He covered with success the genres of music video, photojournalism, portrait photography and pop culture. As a music video director, he made "Give It Away" and "Scar Tissue" (Red Hot Chili Peppers), "Sly" (Massive Attack), "Mysterious Ways" (U2), "Big Time Sensuality" (Björk), "Fever" (Madonna) and "German Bold Italic" (Towa Tei feat. Kylie Minogue). As a photojournalist he covered such events as the Romanian Revolution of 1989 and the 2001 September 11 attack of the World Trade Center. He has also been a regular contributor to Vogue Italia, Vogue China, Vanity Fair, The New York Times Magazine, Interview and Visionaire as a fashion and portrait photographer.

In 2005, Palm Pictures added to Directors Label, its DVD series dedicated to the best music video directors, a retrospective of his work, The Work of Director Stéphane Sednaoui.

Early career
Although Sednaoui never received formal training as a photographer or director, it was with the support of two major artists, William Klein and Jean-Paul Gaultier, that he shaped his artistic approach between the ages of 18 and 22. At 18 he started as a casting director for advertising campaigns before passing in front of the camera to become the face of Jean-Paul Gaultier's brand for two years (1982–1984). Through this collaboration he modeled for photographers Steven Meisel and Peter Lindbergh, and for artist Andy Warhol and William Klein. At 21 he was offered by his mentor photographer-director William Klein to be the casting director of the docufiction movie Mode in France (1985).  At 22 he was a dancer in the French choreographer Régine Chopinot's creation: Le Défilé (1985), for which Jean-Paul Gaultier was collaborating by creating the costumes.

The Jean-Paul Gaultier, William Klein, and Regine Chopinot collaborations were documented by Sednaoui and shown years later: his pictures of Gaultier-Chopinot were exhibited in 2007 at the Musée des Arts Décoratifs of the Louvre, and his experience with William Klein was published in 2009 as a portfolio in the French magazine "Paradis".

Career
(A presentation of Sednaoui's work in different mediums in chronological order)

Photographic essays
Impregnated with the most experimental side of his masters’ work, William Klein, Robert Frank, Bill Brandt, Sednaoui's first photographic projects were in the form of abstract Photographic essays.

Portraits, pop culture, fashion, and photography
Portraiture: Sednaoui's first editorial assignment was at age 21 when he was offered to do portraits for UK Tatler magazine and then for French newspaper Libération. He has since collaborated with many magazines, among them: Vanity Fair, The New York Times Magazine, Interview and the French newspaper Le Monde.

Pop Culture: He then began contributing to pop culture magazine The Face and Annie Flanders' Details publication (initially an underground magazine founded by Annie Flanders) in 1988. There he mixed pop culture with fashion references. In the hand-made decoupage story Fashion Heroes, Sednaoui photographed designers Jean-Paul Gaultier, Azzedine Alaia and Vivienne Westwood, alongside the models of that era, the story was awarded by William Klein and Jean-Paul Goude. Sednaoui started creating visuals and album covers for artists such as Björk, Mick Jagger and Madonna.

Fashion: In parallel to his start in Pop Culture, Franca Sozzani gave Sednaoui his first fashion assignment for the Italian magazine Per Lui and later for Vogue Italia. Sednaoui's initial approach of fashion was energetic and sometimes cartoonish like in his Pop Culture images. A more narrative cinematic approach will emerge in 2000 naturally influenced by his years as a music video director. During this period Sednaoui was a regular contributor to Vogue Italia, French Numéro, Vogue China, and Visionaire.

Photojournalism
He photographed the Romanian Revolution of 1989 (published in French newspaper Libération and UK Arena magazine). Ten years later he photographed and filmed the fall of the twin towers on the September 11 attacks and joined the search and rescue teams at Ground Zero during the following days (the following weeks a portfolio was published in Talk magazine and was the cover of a special issue of French newspaper Libération. In September 2011 Time magazine published a complete portfolio on its website). The National September 11 Memorial & Museum has dedicated an entire room to Sednaoui's images. The book Search and Rescue at Ground Zero was published by Kehrer Verlag in 2014. In her foreword Alice M. Greenwald the director of the museum wrote: "We are indebted to Stéphane Sednaoui, who felt compelled – not as a photographer but as a human being – to rush down, that afternoon, to what would soon come to be known as Ground Zero, hoping to volunteer in the search and rescue efforts underway".

Music videos

After his breakthrough in France with a video for the French rap band NTM (1990), Sednaoui moved to the US where his video for the Red Hot Chili Peppers' "Give It Away" (1991) won an award at the 1992 MTV Video Music Award.

Other Sednaoui music videos that were nominated or received MTV Video Music Awards are, "Sleep to Dream" (Fiona Apple), "Mysterious Ways" (U2), "Today" (The Smashing Pumpkins), "Big Time Sensuality" (Björk), "7 Seconds" (Youssou N'Dour and Neneh Cherry), "Queer" (Garbage), "Hell Is Round the Corner" (Tricky), "Ironic" (Alanis Morissette), "Possibly Maybe" (Björk), "GBI: German Bold Italic" (Towa Tei featuring Kylie Minogue) and "Le Nouveau Western" (MC Solaar).

His work is documented in The Work of Director Stephane Sednaoui (2005) from the Directors Label series, a collection of DVDs devoted to music video directors, along with Spike Jonze, Michel Gondry, Anton Corbijn, Jonathan Glazer, Chris Cunningham and Mark Romanek.

By end of 2001, excepted on rare occasions, Sednaoui stopped directing music videos.

Art
Over the years Sednaoui has redefined his artistic approach to focus on his fine-art and cinematographic projects. New and existing work have been exhibited recently at the MoMA, New York (2015)– the 9/11 Memorial Museum (2013–2015), New York – the Brooklyn Museum, New York (2013 – the Barbican Center, London (2014) – Le Grand Palais, Paris (2015)– the National Gallery of Victoria, Melbourne (2014) and Sam Art Projects Foundation, Paris (2013).

Acting
Sednaoui prominent roles are, in G.H.B. (2013) playing opposite Marina Hands, directed by Laetitia Masson; and in Samui Song (2016) playing opposite Laila Boonyasak and Vithaya Pansringarm, directed by Pen-Ek Ratanaruang

Personal life
His mother was the photographic agent Yannick Morisot and his uncle the jazzman David Earle Johnson.

He was in relationships with singers Björk and Kylie Minogue with whom he also collaborated artistically. In October 2001, Laetitia Casta gave birth to their daughter Sahteene. 

Sednaoui lives in Paris and New York. His Egyptian-born grandfather came from a Melkite Greek Catholic family of Syrian descent. The family finds its roots in the city of Sednaya in Syria, which is where the surname originates from. The Sednaoui family migrated to Egypt at the end of the 19th century and developed successful department stores in Cairo. These were once considered the Middle Eastern counterpart of the famous department stores known in London, Paris and New York.

Filmography

Short films
"Acqua Natasa" (2002)
"Walk on the Wild Side" (2005) A 10-minute film based on Lou Reed's song "Walk on the Wild Side".
"Army of Me" (2005) An animation based on Björk's song "Army of Me".
'Clues: The Mother of My Death" (2014)

Music videos
1990 
"Le monde de demain" by Suprême NTM

1991
"Kozmik" by Ziggy Marley
"Give It Away" by Red Hot Chili Peppers
"Mysterious Ways" by U2

1992 
"Breaking the Girl" by Red Hot Chili Peppers
"Sometimes Salvation" by The Black Crowes, with as main character Sofia Coppola

1993 
"Way of the Wind" (version 1) by P.M. Dawn
"Fever" by Madonna
"Today" by The Smashing Pumpkins
"Big Time Sensuality" by Björk

1994 
"Nouveau Western" by MC Solaar
"7 Seconds" (version 1) by Youssou N'Dour & Neneh Cherry
"Sly" by Massive Attack

1995 
"Fragile" by Isaac Hayes
"Queer" by Garbage
"Fallen Angel" by Traci Lords
"Hell Is Round the Corner" by Tricky
"Pumpkin" by Tricky
"Ironic" by Alanis Morissette 

1996 
"Whatever You Want" by Tina Turner 
"Here Come the Aliens" by Tricky 
"Milk" by Garbage 
"Discothèque" (version 1) by U2 
"Possibly Maybe" by Björk 

1997 
"Sleep to Dream" by Fiona Apple 
"Gangster Moderne" by MC Solaar 
"Never Is a Promise" by Fiona Apple 
"GBI: German Bold Italic" by Towa Tei & Kylie Minogue 

1998 
"Thank U" by Alanis Morissette
"Lotus" by R.E.M.
"I'm Known" by Keziah Jones
"Falling in Love Again" by Eagle-Eye Cherry

1999
"You Look So Fine" by Garbage
"Sweet Child o' Mine" by Sheryl Crow
"Scar Tissue" by Red Hot Chili Peppers
"For Real" by Tricky featuring DJ Muggs
"Nothing Much Happens" by Ben Lee
"Summer Son" by Texas
"Around the World" by Red Hot Chili Peppers
"The Chemicals Between Us" by Bush

2000
"Mixed Bizness" by Beck
"Tailler la zone" by Alain Souchon
"Let's Ride" by Q-Tip
"Disco Science" by Mirwais
"I Can't Wait" by Mirwais

2001
"Dream On" by Depeche Mode
"Little L" by Jamiroquai

2003 
"Anti-matter" by Tricky

2009 
"Get It Right" by Y.A.S.

2014 
"Distant Lover" by Emmanuelle Seigner

Books
Search and Rescue at Ground Zero, Kehrer Verlag, (2014)

Compilations
The Work of Director Stephane Sednaoui (2005) from the Directors Label series released by Palm Pictures.

References

External links
 Stéphane Sednaoui official site
 
 The Directors Label "The Work of Director:Stéphane Sednaoui" webpage
 Interview on Massive Attack Area

French music video directors
French photojournalists
French people of Egyptian descent
French people of Syrian descent
Living people
Fashion photographers
1963 births
Artists from Paris